Wudinna Airport  is located  west of Wudinna, South Australia.

See also
 List of airports in South Australia

References

External links
 Wudinna Airport at Wudinna District Council

Airports in South Australia
Eyre Peninsula